"B.O.T.A. (Baddest of Them All)" is a song by English DJs Eliza Rose and Interplanetary Criminal. Written and performed by Rose, it includes a sample of Lisa Lisa and Cult Jam's 1991 song "Let the Beat Hit 'Em" (LL W:Love RC Mix). "B.O.T.A." initially received a digital and limited dubplate release through Rose's independent record label Rosebud Recordings on 15 June 2022. After gaining popularity through DJ sets at the Glastonbury Festival, the track went viral on the app TikTok and was released on a licensing deal through Warner Records on 12 August 2022.

The song topped the UK Singles Chart for two consecutive weeks, and became the chart's milestone 1,400th number-one single, and the first by a female DJ since Sonique's "It Feels So Good" in 2000. "B.O.T.A. (Baddest of Them All)" also charted in the top 10 in Australia, Lithuania and New Zealand, and spent six weeks at number one on the Irish Singles Chart. Rose performed the song live at the 25th MOBO Awards alongside Sonique and Sweet Female Attitude. In December 2022, "B.O.T.A." was certified platinum in the UK and Australia, and appeared in critic year-end lists by the NME, Pitchfork and The Guardian.

Background
Eliza Rose had been a DJ on the London circuit for 7 years. In February 2022, she signed to One House. According to Rose, the song originated when she was provided the beat by Manchester-based producer DJ Zach Bruce (Interplanetary Criminal). She then wrote majority of the song within a few minutes, emphasising adding "cutesy" elements as well as "grittiness". She detailed the thought process behind the song in an interview, saying: "This track is so nostalgic. When I first heard the beat it gave me instant memories of growing up in the 90s and the bubblegum-tinged dance music from that time. Going on seaside holidays, hanging around the surreal atmospheres of the arcade, meeting boys, and being cute and flirty. Then you have the "Baddest of Them All" lyric that counteracts that innocence and adds the edge, which came to me at just the right time via a Jackie Brown Blaxploitation poster. It definitely reflects the two contrasting aspects of my personality. Girly and cutesie, but a bit of a bad gal too!"

Composition
The song was described as a "supremely fun, suave, 4×4 anthem with plenty of swagger and flirtatious lyrics that permeate your mind." Dazed said that the song "has elements of UK garage, which remains one of Rose's biggest inspirations, and maybe a little dash of PC Music, but really it's a tribute to 90s dance."

Music video
The music video was released on 15 June 2022 and was filmed in Rose's home of Hackney, London. Directed by Jeanie Crystal, it features guest appearances by drag icon Ms Sharon Le Grand, Vogue Ball founder Taboo, dancer Sakeema Peng Crook and artist Wet Mess. Julian Broad worked on the video as a lighting technician. The Lewis Carroll-inspired video celebrates the LGBTQ+ performance community.

Charts

Weekly charts

Year-end charts

Certifications

References

2022 songs
2022 singles
English house music songs
Irish Singles Chart number-one singles
UK Singles Chart number-one singles